Hahn is a lunar impact crater that is located near the northeastern limb of the Moon. The crater appears oval when viewed from the Earth due to foreshortening. It is located less than one crater diameter to the southeast of Berosus, a slightly smaller formation.

The inner wall of Hahn contains a system of terraces, particularly in the southern half. A smaller crater lies across the northwest rim, forming a break that reaches the interior floor. The interior floor has a region of lower albedo in the northern half, making it darker in appearance than the southern section of the floor. At the midpoint of the interior is an elongated central ridge, with the longer extent oriented north–south. The floor is also marked by several tiny craterlets.

Satellite craters
By convention these features are identified on lunar maps by placing the letter on the side of the crater midpoint that is closest to Hahn.

References
 

 
 
 
 
 
 
 
 
 
 
 
 

Impact craters on the Moon
Otto Hahn